My Italian Greyhound is the fifth studio album by Norwegian singer-songwriter Bertine Zetlitz and was released on September 18, 2006.

Track listing

Chart positions

References

2006 albums
Bertine Zetlitz albums